Fran Sheehan (born March 26, 1949) is an American rock musician best known for being the bass player in the early incarnation of the rock band Boston.

Sheehan was perhaps the most experienced musician in the original lineup of Boston.

Life and career
Sheehan's father Skip Sheehan was a vaudeville performer, and he began performing at the age of five. He studied music at North Shore Community College and the New England Conservatory of Music. He dropped out of school to pursue a professional musical career.

Sheehan was one of three musicians added to the Boston lineup shortly after band leader Tom Scholz and vocalist Brad Delp signed a recording contract with Epic Records in 1976. Sheehan, drummer Sib Hashian and guitarist Barry Goudreau were all long-time friends of Delp's who had worked with the singer in various other bands over the previous few years.  The band was an overnight success, but relations between Scholz and the other four band members were strained from the beginning.

Following Goudreau's and Hashian's departure, Sheehan was fired from the band midway through the sessions for Boston's Third Stage album in the early 80s. He received a songwriting credit for "Cool the Engines," however.  After leaving Boston, Sheehan (along with two other ex-band members) sued Tom Scholz, before settling out of court.  

After leaving Boston, Sheehan formed Fran Sheehan and the All-Star Band, who gigged extensively but never released an album. In 1985, he produced a 4-track demo tape for a then-totally unknown local band called Extreme.

Sheehan stopped playing the bass during the 1990s for several years after he injured his arm and hand in a biking accident. However, he eventually recovered and still appears on stage from time or time.  In the meantime, he sang with various bands. 

He has made several guest appearances over the years, including Hallelujah with Sammy Hagar and The Waboritas.

In August 2007, Sheehan, along with other previous and current Boston band members, appeared on stage at the Brad Delp Tribute Show held at the Bank of America Pavilion in Boston.

On February 25, 2012, Sheehan played with Boston bandmate Barry Goudreau on stage outdoors for a three-hour benefit concert in Florida at the "All Star Jam for the Sydney and Berne Davis Art Center in Fort Myers, Florida.

References

External links
Interview with Fran Sheehan by Michael Hill dated 1998
Fran Sheehan at ThirdStage
Official Boston Site
My bass is a monster
Discogs Artist 435086

Boston (band) members
American rock musicians
American rock bass guitarists
American male bass guitarists
1949 births
Living people
Musicians from Norfolk, Virginia
Guitarists from Virginia
American male guitarists
20th-century American guitarists